Robert atte Lee (fl. 1379–1386), of Reading, Berkshire, was an English politician and brazier.

Family
The poll tax information from 1379 shows him to have been married to a woman named Alice.

Career
He was a Member (MP) of the Parliament of England for Reading in 1386.

References

Year of birth missing
Year of death missing
English MPs 1386
People from Reading, Berkshire